International Rugby Challenge (also known simply as International Rugby) is a rugby game on Mega Drive (Genesis) and the Amiga.

Reception
It received a review score of 2% in the UK magazine Amiga Power. This review noted flaws including several spelling errors ("Murray Field", the Parc de Paris, "", ""), the clock not stopping when the gameplay is paused, players often running over the ball without picking it up or coming under human control, and frequent crashes during long matches.

The Mega Drive version fared better, with Mega awarding 80% and MegaTech scoring it 75% This version of the game was also released in North American but only through the Sega Channel service.

References

External links
''International Rugby Challenge at Lemon Amiga
International Rugby Challenge at Amiga Hall of Light

1993 video games
Amiga games
Sega Genesis games
Rugby union video games
Domark games
Tiertex Design Studios games
Video games developed in the United Kingdom